Arturo Alfonso Schomburg (January 24, 1874 – June 10, 1938), was a historian, writer, collector, and activist. Schomburg was a Puerto Rican of African and German descent. He moved to the United States in 1891, where he researched and raised awareness of the contributions that Afro-Latin Americans and African Americans have made to society. He was an important intellectual figure in the Harlem Renaissance. Over the years, he collected literature, art, slave narratives, and other materials of African history, which were purchased to become the basis of the Schomburg Center for Research in Black Culture, named in his honor, at the New York Public Library (NYPL) branch in Harlem.

Early years
Schomburg was born in the town of Santurce in the Captaincy General of Puerto Rico, to Mary Joseph, a freeborn black midwife from St. Croix in the Danish West Indies, and Carlos Federico Schomburg, a merchant and son of a German immigrant to Puerto Rico. He was baptized as a Catholic, with the name Arturo Alfonso, at the Church of San Francisco de Asis in Santurce, San Juan.

While Schomburg was in grade school, one of his teachers claimed that black people had no history, heroes or accomplishments. Inspired to prove the teacher wrong, Schomburg determined that he would find and document the accomplishments of Africans on their own continent and in the diaspora.

Schomburg was educated at San Juan's Instituto Popular, where he learned commercial printing. At St. Thomas College on the island of St. Thomas in the Danish West Indies, he studied Negro literature.

He became a member of the "Revolutionary Committee of Puerto Rico" and became an active advocate of Puerto Rico's and Cuba's independence from Spain. In 1892, Schomburg co-founded Las Dos Antillas (The Two Islands), a political club that advocated for the independence of Cuba and Puerto Rico. The club existed from 1892 to 1898, and members discussed issues such as providing weapons, medical supplies, and financial aid to independence movements.

Marriage and family
On June 30, 1895, Schomburg married Elizabeth Hatcher of Staunton, Virginia. She had come to New York as part of a wave of migration from the South that would increase in the 20th century and be known as the Great Migration. They had three sons: Máximo Gómez (named after the Dominican military leader of the Cuban struggle for independence); Arthur Alfonso, Jr. and Kingsley Guarionex Schomburg (named after Guarionex, a renowned cacique of the Taíno).

After Elizabeth died in 1900, Schomburg married Elizabeth Morrow Taylor of Williamsburg, a village in Rockingham County, North Carolina. They were married on March 17, 1902, and had two sons: Reginald Stanton and Nathaniel José Schomburg. After Elizabeth Morrow Taylor's death, Schomburg married Elizabeth Green, with whom he had three more children.

Career
In 1896, Schomburg began teaching Spanish in New York. From 1901 to 1906 Schomburg was employed as messenger and clerk in the law firm of Pryor, Mellis and Harris, New York City. In 1906, he began working for the Bankers Trust Company. Later, he became a supervisor of the Caribbean and Latin American Mail Section, and held that until he left in 1929.

While supporting himself and his family, Schomburg began his intellectual work of writing about Caribbean and African-American history. His first known article, "Is Hayti Decadent?", was published in 1904 in The Unique Advertiser. In 1909 he wrote Placido, a Cuban Martyr, a short pamphlet about the poet and independence fighter Gabriel de la Concepción Valdés.

The Negro Society for Historical Research
In 1911, Schomburg co-founded with John Edward Bruce the Negro Society for Historical Research, to create an institute to support scholarly efforts. For the first time, it brought together African, West Indian, and Afro-American scholars.  In 1914, Schomburg joined the exclusive American Negro Academy, becoming, from 1920 to 1928, the fifth and last President of the organization.  Founded in Washington, DC in 1897, this first major African American learned society brought together scholars, editors, and activists to refute racist scholarship, promote black claims to individual, social, and political equality, and publish the history and sociology of African American life.

This was a period of the founding of societies to encourage scholarship in African-American history.  In 1915, Dr. Carter G. Woodson co-founded the Association for the Study of Negro Life and History (now called the Association for the Study of African American Life and History) and began publishing the Journal of Negro History.

Schomburg became involved in the Harlem Renaissance movement, which spread to other African-American communities in the U.S. The concentration of blacks in Harlem from across the US and Caribbean led to a flowering of arts, intellectual and political movements. He was the co-editor of the 1912 edition of Daniel Alexander Payne Murray's Encyclopedia of the Colored Race. He later became disillusioned with the Harlem Renaissance as he felt it that there were no more revolutionaries within it, he told anthologist Nancy Cunard that she should "not expect to find anything revolutionary or critical in these subjected fellows' writings....they have been bought and paid for by white people"

In 1916 Schomburg published what was the first notable bibliography of African-American poetry, A Bibliographical Checklist of American Negro Poetry.

In March 1925 Schomburg published his essay "The Negro Digs Up His Past" in an issue of Survey Graphic devoted to the intellectual life of Harlem.  It had widespread distribution and influence. In "The Negro Digs Up His Past," Schomburg was trying to lay the groundwork for an intellectual refutation of racism. The autodidact historian John Henrik Clarke told of being so inspired by the essay that at the age of 17 he left home in Columbus, Georgia, to seek out Mr. Schomburg to further his studies in African history. Alain Locke included the essay in his edited collection The New Negro.

The Schomburg Collection of Negro Literature and Art
The New York Public Library and the librarian of the 135th Street Branch, Ernestine Rose, purchased Schomburg's private collection for $10,000 funded by the Carnegie Corporation in 1926. This purchase would signal the beginning of the transformation of the 135th street's branch into the Schomburg Center. His collection included a variety of items, including the acquisition of three missing chapters from “The Autobiography of Malcolm X,” that were cut from his manuscript after his death in 1965. They appointed Schomburg curator of the Schomburg Collection of Negro Literature and Art, named in his honor, at the 135th Street Branch (Harlem) of the Library. It was later renamed the Arthur Schomburg Center for Research in Black Culture.

In 1929 Fisk University President Charles S. Johnson invited Schomburg to curate the Negro Collection at the library of Fisk in Nashville, Tennessee. He assisted in the architectural design contributing to the construction of a reading room and browsing space. By the end of Schomburg's tenure at Fisk he had expanded the library's collection from 106 items to 4,600. During 1932 he traveled to Cuba. While there he met various Cuban artists and writers, and acquired more material for his studies.

He was granted an honorary membership of the Men's Business Club in Yonkers, New York. He also held the position of treasurer for the Loyal Sons of Africa in New York and was elevated being the past master of Prince Hall Lodge Number 38, Free and Accepted Masons (F.A.M.) and Rising Sun Chapter Number 4, R.A.M.

Later years
Following dental surgery, Schomburg became ill and died in Madison Park Hospital in Brooklyn New York, on June 10, 1938.  He is buried in the Locust Grove section of Cypress Hills Cemetery.

Legacy
By the 1920s Schomburg had amassed a collection which consisted of artworks, manuscripts, rare books, slave narratives and other artifacts of Black history. The collection formed the cornerstone of the Library's Division of Negro History at its 135th Street Branch in Harlem. The library appointed Schomburg curator of the collection, which was named in his honor: the Schomburg Center for Research in Black Culture. Schomburg used his proceeds from the sale to fund travel to Spain, France, Germany and England, to seek out more pieces of black history to add to the collection. In 2002, scholar Molefi Kete Asante named Schomburg on his list of 100 Greatest African Americans.

To honor Schomburg, Hampshire College awards a $30,000 merit-based scholarship in his name for students who "demonstrate promise in the areas of strong academic performance and leadership at Hampshire College and in the community."

The College of Arts and Sciences at University at Buffalo also has a fellowship named in honor of Schomburg.

Arturo Alfonso Schomburg's work served as an inspiration to Puerto Ricans, Latinos and Afro-Americans alike. During the Harlem Renaissance, Zora Neale Hurston and others had used Schomburg's materials. The power of knowing about the great contribution that Afro-Latin Americans and Afro-Americans have made to society, helped continuing work and future generations in the Civil rights movement.

In 2020, the United States Postal Service featured Schomburg on a postage stamp as part of the series on the Harlem Renaissance.

See also

List of Puerto Ricans
 Puerto Rican literature
 List of Puerto Ricans of African descent
 Afro-Puerto Rican
German immigration to Puerto Rico
 L. S. Alexander Gumby, a fellow Black archivist during the Harlem Renaissance
 Carter G. Woodson

References

Further reading
 Thabiti Asukile, "Schomburg, Arturo (Arthur) Alfonso (1874–1938)," Dictionary of Caribbean and Afro–Latin American Biography, edited by Franklin W. Knight & and Henry Louis Gates, Jr. Print . Published online: 2016.  .
 "First Lady Named for Aid to Negroes" (New York Times: 1940-02-14) 
 Elinor Des Verney Sinnette, Arthur Alfonso Schomburg – Black Bibliophile and Collector: A biography, The New York Public Library & Wayne State University Press, Detroit, 1989, 262 pp. 
Helton, Laura and Rafia Zafar, guest editors:  "Arturo Alfonso Schomburg In the Twenty-First Century:  A Special Issue", African American Review (Vol 54, Nos. 1-2) Spring-Summer 2021 ISSN 1945-6182
 Hoffnung-Garskof, Jesse. "The Migrations of Arturo Schomburg: On Being Antillano, Negro, and Puerto Rican in New York 1891–1938". Journal of American Ethnic History, vol. 21, no. 1, 2001, pp. 3–49. JSTOR, www.jstor.org/stable/27502778.
Vanessa Valdés, Diasporic Blackness: The Life and Times of Arturo Alfonso Schomburg, Albany, NY: SUNY Press,  2017, 202 pp.

External links

Arturo Alfonso Schomburg at Find A Grave
Schomburg Studies on the Black Experience
Schomburg (Arthur A.) Papers, 1724–1895 (1904–1938), New York Public Library
"Schomburg Center for Research in Black Culture", New York Public Library
"The Arthur A. Schomburg Papers"
"Schomburg Museum", Kappa Alpha Psi history

1874 births
1938 deaths
Burials at Cypress Hills Cemetery
Puerto Rican educators
African-American history between emancipation and the civil rights movement
People from Santurce, Puerto Rico
Puerto Rican people of German descent
Historians of Africa
African-American librarians
American librarians
Hispanic and Latino American librarians
Harlem Renaissance
Collectors
Puerto Rican independence activists
African-American Catholics
Roman Catholic activists
Emigrants from Spanish Puerto Rico to the United States